Windows 10 is a major release of Microsoft's Windows NT operating system. It is the direct successor to Windows 8.1, which was released nearly two years earlier. It was released to manufacturing on July 15, 2015, and later to retail on July 29, 2015. Windows 10 was made available for download via MSDN and TechNet, as a free upgrade for retail copies of Windows 8 and Windows 8.1 users via the Windows Store, and to Windows 7 users via Windows Update. Windows 10 receives new builds on an ongoing basis, which are available at no additional cost to users, in addition to additional test builds of Windows 10, which are available to Windows Insiders. Devices in enterprise environments can receive these updates at a slower pace, or use long-term support milestones that only receive critical updates, such as security patches, over their ten-year lifespan of extended support. In June 2021, Microsoft announced that support for Windows 10 editions which are not in the Long-Term Servicing Channel (LTSC) will end on October 14, 2025. 

Windows 10 received generally positive reviews upon its original release. Critics praised Microsoft's decision to provide the desktop-oriented interface in line with previous versions of Windows, contrasting the tablet-oriented approach of Windows 8, although Windows 10's touch-oriented user interface mode was criticized for containing regressions upon the touch-oriented interface of its predecessor. Critics also praised the improvements to Windows 10's bundled software over Windows 8.1, Xbox Live integration, as well as the functionality and capabilities of the Cortana personal assistant and the replacement of Internet Explorer with Microsoft Edge. However, media outlets have been critical of the changes to operating system behaviors, including mandatory update installation, privacy concerns over data collection performed by the OS for Microsoft and its partners, and adware-like tactics used to promote the operating system on its release.

Microsoft initially aimed to have Windows 10 installed on over one billion devices within three years of its release; that goal was ultimately reached almost five years after release on March 16, 2020, and is by now most used version in virtually all countries. By January 2018, Windows 10 surpassed Windows 7 as the most popular version of Windows worldwide. , Windows 10 is estimated to have a 72% share of Windows PCs, still 6.2× the share of its successor Windows 11 (and 6.0× of Windows 7). The share has been declining from a January 2022 peak of 82%, since Windows 11, which is now the second most popular Windows version in many countries. Windows 10 has a  58% share of all PCs (the rest being other Windows editions and other operating systems such as macOS and Linux), and a  22% share of all devices (including mobile, tablet and console) are running Windows 10. On June 24, 2021, Microsoft announced Windows 10's successor, Windows 11, which was released on October 5, 2021.

Windows 10 is the final version of Windows that supports 32-bit processors (IA-32 and ARMv7-based) and devices with BIOS firmware. Its successor, Windows 11, requires a device that uses UEFI firmware and a 64-bit processor in any supported architecture (x86-64 for x86 and ARMv8 for ARM).

Development 
At the Microsoft Worldwide Partner Conference in 2011, Andrew Lees, the chief of Microsoft's mobile technologies, said that the company intended to have a single software ecosystem for PCs, smartphones, tablets, and other devices: "We won't have an ecosystem for PCs, and one for phones, and one for tabletsthey'll all come together."

In December 2013, technology writer Mary Jo Foley reported that Microsoft was working on an update to Windows 8 codenamed "Threshold", after a planet in its Halo franchise. Similarly to "Blue" (which became Windows 8.1), Foley described Threshold, not as a single operating system, but as a "wave of operating systems" across multiple Microsoft platforms and services, quoting Microsoft sources, scheduled for the second quarter of 2015. She also stated that one of the goals for Threshold was to create a unified application platform and development toolkit for Windows, Windows Phone and Xbox One (which all use a similar kernel based on Windows NT).

At the Build Conference in April 2014, Microsoft's Terry Myerson unveiled an updated version of Windows 8.1 (build 9697) that added the ability to run Windows Store apps inside desktop windows and a more traditional Start menu in place of the Start screen seen in Windows 8. The new Start menu takes after Windows 7's design by using only a portion of the screen and including a Windows 7-style application listing in the first column. The second column displays Windows 8-style app tiles. Myerson said that these changes would occur in a future update, but did not elaborate. Microsoft also unveiled the concept of a "universal Windows app", allowing Windows Store apps created for Windows 8.1 to be ported to Windows Phone 8.1 and Xbox One while sharing a common codebase, with an interface designed for different device form factors, and allowing user data and licenses for an app to be shared between multiple platforms. Windows Phone 8.1 would share nearly 90% of the common Windows Runtime APIs with Windows 8.1 on PCs.

Screenshots of a Windows build purported to be Threshold were leaked in July 2014, showing the previously presented Start menu and windowed Windows Store apps, followed by a further screenshot of a build identifying itself as "Windows Technical Preview", numbered 9834, in September 2014, showing a new virtual desktop system, a notification center, and a new File Explorer icon.

Announcement 

On September 30, 2014, Microsoft officially announced that Threshold would be unveiled during a media event as Windows 10. Myerson said that Windows 10 would be Microsoft's "most comprehensive platform ever", providing a single, unified platform for desktop and laptop computers, tablets, smartphones, and all-in-one devices. He emphasized that Windows 10 would take steps towards restoring user interface mechanics from Windows 7 to improve the experience for users on non-touch devices, noting criticism of Windows 8's touch-oriented interface by keyboard and mouse users. Despite these concessions, Myerson noted that the touch-optimized interface would evolve as well on 10.

In regards to Microsoft naming the new operating system Windows 10 instead of Windows 9, Terry Myerson said that "based on the product that's coming, and just how different our approach will be overall, it wouldn't be right to call it Windows 9." He also joked that they could not call it "Windows One" (referring to several recent Microsoft products with a similar brand, such as OneDrive, OneNote, and the Xbox One) because Windows 1.0 already existed. At a San Francisco conference in October 2014, Tony Prophet, Microsoft's Vice President of Windows Marketing, said that Windows 9 "came and went", and that Windows 10 would not be "an incremental step from Windows 8.1", but "a material step. We're trying to create one platform, one eco-system that unites as many of the devices from the small embedded Internet of Things, through tablets, through phones, through PCs and, ultimately, into the Xbox."

Further details surrounding Windows 10's consumer-oriented features were presented during another media event held on January 21, 2015, entitled "Windows 10: The Next Chapter". The keynote featured the unveiling of Cortana integration within the operating system, new Xbox-oriented features, Windows 10 Mobile, an updated Office Mobile suite, Surface Huba large-screened Windows 10 device for enterprise collaboration based upon Perceptive Pixel technology, along with HoloLens‑augmented reality eyewear and an associated platform for building apps that can render holograms through HoloLens.

Additional developer-oriented details surrounding the "Universal Windows Platform" concept were revealed and discussed during Microsoft's Build developers' conference. Among them were the unveiling of "Islandwood", which provides a middleware toolchain for compiling Objective-C-based software (particularly iOS) to run as universal apps on Windows 10 and Windows 10 Mobile. A port of Candy Crush Saga made using the toolkit, which shared much of its code with the iOS version, was demonstrated, alongside the announcement that the King-developed game would be bundled with Windows 10 at launch.

At the 2015 Ignite conference, Microsoft employee Jerry Nixon stated that Windows 10 would be the "last version of Windows", a statement that Microsoft confirmed was "reflective" of its view of the operating system being a "service" with new versions and updates to be released over time. In 2021, however, Microsoft announced that Windows 10 would be succeeded on compatible hardware by Windows 11–and that Windows 10 support will end on October 14, 2025.

Release and marketing 
On June 1, 2015, Microsoft announced that Windows 10 would be released on July 29, 2015. On July 20, 2015, Microsoft began "Upgrade Your World", an advertising campaign centering on Windows 10, with the premiere of television commercials in Australia, Canada, France, Germany, Japan, the United Kingdom, and the United States. The commercials focused on the tagline "A more human way to do", emphasizing new features and technologies supported by Windows 10 that sought to provide a more "personal" experience to users. The campaign culminated with launch events in thirteen cities on July 29, 2015, which celebrated "the unprecedented role our biggest fans played in the development of Windows 10".

Features 

Windows 10 makes its user experience and functionality more consistent between different classes of device, and addresses most of the shortcomings in the user interface that were introduced in Windows 8. Windows 10 Mobile, the successor to Windows Phone 8.1, shared some user interface elements and apps with its PC counterpart.

Windows 10 supports universal apps, an expansion of the Metro-style first introduced in Windows 8. Universal apps can be designed to run across multiple Microsoft product families with nearly identical codeincluding PCs, tablets, smartphones, embedded systems, Xbox One, Surface Hub and Mixed Reality. The Windows user interface was revised to handle transitions between a mouse-oriented interface and a touchscreen-optimized interface based on available input devicesparticularly on 2-in-1 PCs. Both interfaces include an updated Start menu which incorporates elements of Windows 7's traditional Start menu with the tiles of Windows 8.

The Windows Runtime app ecosystem was revised into the Universal Windows Platform (UWP). These universal apps are made to run across multiple platforms and device classes, including smartphones, tablets, Xbox One consoles, and other devices compatible with Windows 10. Windows apps share code across platforms, have responsive designs that adapt to the needs of the device and available inputs, can synchronize data between Windows 10 devices (including notifications, credentials, and allowing cross-platform multiplayer for games), and are distributed through the Microsoft Store (rebranded from Windows Store since September 2017). Developers can allow "cross-buys", where purchased licenses for an app apply to all of the user's compatible devices, rather than only the one they purchased on (e.g., a user purchasing an app on PC is also entitled to use the smartphone version at no extra cost).

The ARM version of Windows 10 allows running applications for x86 processors through 32-bit software emulation.

On Windows 10, the Microsoft Store serves as a unified storefront for apps, video content, and eBooks. Windows 10 also allows web apps and desktop software (using either Win32 or .NET Framework) to be packaged for distribution on the Microsoft Store. Desktop software distributed through Windows Store is packaged using the App-V system to allow sandboxing.

User interface and desktop 

A new iteration of the Start menu is used on the Windows 10 desktop, with a list of places and other options on the left side, and tiles representing applications on the right. The menu can be resized, and expanded into a full-screen display, which is the default option in Tablet mode. A new virtual desktop system was added by a feature known as Task View, which displays all open windows and allows users to switch between them, or switch between multiple workspaces. Universal apps, which previously could be used only in full screen mode, can now be used in self-contained windows similarly to other programs. Program windows can now be snapped to quadrants of the screen by dragging them to the corner. When a window is snapped to one side of the screen, Task View appears and the user is prompted to choose a second window to fill the unused side of the screen (called "Snap Assist"). The Windows system icons were also changed.

Charms have been removed; their functionality in universal apps is accessed from an App commands menu on their title bar. In its place is Action Center, which displays notifications and settings toggles. It is accessed by clicking an icon in the notification area, or dragging from the right of the screen. Notifications can be synced between multiple devices. The Settings app (formerly PC Settings) was refreshed and now includes more options that were previously exclusive to the desktop Control Panel.

Windows 10 is designed to adapt its user interface based on the type of device being used and available input methods. It offers two separate user interface modes: a user interface optimized for mouse and keyboard, and a "Tablet mode" designed for touchscreens. Users can toggle between these two modes at any time, and Windows can prompt or automatically switch when certain events occur, such as disabling Tablet mode on a tablet if a keyboard or mouse is plugged in, or when a 2-in-1 PC is switched to its laptop state. In Tablet mode, programs default to a maximized view, and the taskbar contains a back button and hides buttons for opened or pinned programs by default; Task View is used instead to switch between programs. The full screen Start menu is used in this mode, similarly to Windows 8, but scrolls vertically instead of horizontally.

System security 

Windows 10 incorporates multi-factor authentication technology based upon standards developed by the FIDO Alliance. The operating system includes improved support for biometric authentication through the Windows Hello platform. Devices with supported cameras (requiring infrared illumination, such as Intel RealSense) allow users to log in with iris or face recognition, similarly to Kinect. Devices with supported readers allow users to log in through fingerprint recognition. Support was also added for palm-vein scanning through a partnership with Fujitsu in February 2018. Credentials are stored locally and protected using asymmetric encryption.

In 2017, researchers demonstrated that Windows Hello could be bypassed on fully-updated Windows 10 version 1703 with a color printout of a person's picture taken with an IR camera. In 2021, researchers were again able to bypass the Windows Hello functionalities by using custom hardware disguised as a camera, which presented an IR photo of the owner's face.

In addition to biometric authentication, Windows Hello supports authentication with a PIN. By default, Windows requires a PIN to consist of four digits, but can be configured to permit more complex PINs. However, a PIN is not a simpler password. While passwords are transmitted to domain controllers, PINs are not. They are tied to one device, and if compromised, only one device is affected. Backed by a Trusted Platform Module (TPM) chip, Windows uses PINs to create strong asymmetric key pairs. As such, the authentication token transmitted to the server is harder to crack. In addition, whereas weak passwords may be broken via rainbow tables, TPM causes the much-simpler Windows PINs to be resilient to brute-force attacks.

When Windows 10 was first introduced, multi-factor authentication was provided by two components: Windows Hello and Passport (not to be confused with the Passport platform of 1998). Later, Passport was merged into Windows Hello.

The enterprise edition of Windows 10 offers additional security features; administrators can set up policies for the automatic encryption of sensitive data, selectively block applications from accessing encrypted data, and enable Device Guarda system which allows administrators to enforce a high-security environment by blocking the execution of software that is not digitally signed by a trusted vendor or Microsoft. Device Guard is designed to protect against zero-day exploits, and runs inside a hypervisor so that its operation remains separated from the operating system itself.

Command line 
The console windows based on Windows Console (for any console app, not just PowerShell and Windows Command Prompt) can now be resized without any restrictions, can be made to cover the full screen by pressing , and can use standard keyboard shortcuts, such as those for cut, copy, and paste. Other features such as word wrap and transparency were also added. These functions can be disabled to revert to the legacy console if needed.

The Anniversary Update added Windows Subsystem for Linux (WSL), which allows the installation of a user space environment from a supported Linux distribution that runs natively on Windows. The subsystem translates Linux system calls to those of the Windows NT kernel (only claims full system call compatibility as of WSL 2, included in a later Windows update). The environment can execute the Bash shell and 64-bit command-line programs (WSL 2 also supports 32-bit Linux programs and graphics, assuming supporting software installed, and GPUs support for other uses). Windows applications cannot be executed from the Linux environment, and vice versa. Linux distributions for Windows Subsystem for Linux are obtained through Microsoft Store. The feature initially supported an Ubuntu-based environment; Microsoft announced in May 2017 that it would add Fedora and OpenSUSE environment options as well.

Storage requirements 
To reduce the storage footprint of the operating system, Windows 10 automatically compresses system files. The system can reduce the storage footprint of Windows by approximately 1.5GB for 32-bit systems and 2.6GB for 64-bit systems. The level of compression used is dependent on a performance assessment performed during installations or by OEMs, which tests how much compression can be used without harming operating system performance. Furthermore, the Refresh and Reset functions use runtime system files instead, making a separate recovery partition redundant, allowing patches and updates to remain installed following the operation, and further reducing the amount of space required for Windows 10 by up to 12GB. These functions replace the WIMBoot mode introduced on Windows 8.1 Update, which allowed OEMs to configure low-capacity devices with flash-based storage to use Windows system files out of the compressed WIM image typically used for installation and recovery. Windows 10 also includes a function in its Settings app that allows users to view a breakdown of how their device's storage capacity is being used by different types of files, and determine whether certain types of files are saved to internal storage or an SD card by default.

Online services and functionality 
Windows 10 introduces Microsoft Edge, a new default web browser. It initially featured a new standards-compliant rendering engine derived from Trident, and also includes annotation tools and integration with other Microsoft platforms present within Windows 10. Internet Explorer 11 is maintained on Windows 10 for compatibility purposes, but is deprecated in favor of Edge and, since mid-June 2022, is no longer supported on editions which follow Microsoft's Modern Lifecycle Policy. The initial version of Edge was later succeeded by a new iteration derived from the Chromium Project and Blink layout engine, which replaced the previous EdgeHTML-based version of Edge (renamed "Microsoft Edge Legacy"), and is bundled with the OS by default from build 20H2 onwards.

Windows 10 incorporates a universal search box located alongside the Start and Task View buttons, which can be hidden or condensed into a single button. Previous versions featured Microsoft's intelligent personal assistant Cortana, which was first introduced with Windows Phone 8.1 in 2014, and supports both text and voice input. Many of its features are a direct carryover from Windows Phone, including integration with Bing, setting reminders, a Notebook feature for managing personal information, as well as searching for files, playing music, launching applications and setting reminders or sending emails. Since the November 2019 update, Microsoft has begun to downplay Cortana as part of a repositioning of the product towards enterprise use, with the May 2020 update removing its Windows shell integration and consumer-oriented features.

Microsoft Family Safety is replaced by Microsoft Family, a parental controls system that applies across Windows platforms and Microsoft online services. Users can create a designated family, and monitor and restrict the actions of users designated as children, such as access to websites, enforcing age ratings on Microsoft Store purchases, and other restrictions. The service can also send weekly e-mail reports to parents detailing a child's computer usage. Unlike previous versions of Windows, child accounts in a family must be associated with a Microsoft accountwhich allows these settings to apply across all Windows 10 devices that a particular child is using.

Windows 10 also offers the Wi-Fi Sense feature originating from Windows Phone 8.1; users can optionally have their device automatically connect to suggested open hotspots, and share their home network's password with contacts (either via Skype, People, or Facebook) so they may automatically connect to the network on a Windows 10 device without needing to manually enter its password. Credentials are stored in an encrypted form on Microsoft servers and sent to the devices of the selected contacts. Passwords are not viewable by the guest user, and the guest user is not allowed to access other computers or devices on the network. Wi-Fi Sense is not usable on 802.1X-encrypted networks. Adding "_optout" at the end of the SSID will also block the corresponding network from being used for this feature.

Universal calling and messaging apps for Windows 10 are built in as of the November 2015 update: Messaging, Skype Video, and Phone. These offer built-in alternatives to the Skype download and sync with Windows 10 Mobile.

Multimedia and gaming 

Windows 10 provides greater integration with the Xbox ecosystem. Xbox SmartGlass is succeeded by the Xbox Console Companion (formerly the Xbox app), which allows users to browse their game library (including both PC and Xbox console games), and Game DVR is also available using a keyboard shortcut, allowing users to save the last 30 seconds of gameplay as a video that can be shared to Xbox Live, OneDrive, or elsewhere. Windows 10 also allows users to control and play games from an Xbox One console over a local network. The Xbox Live SDK allows application developers to incorporate Xbox Live functionality into their apps, and future wireless Xbox One accessories, such as controllers, are supported on Windows with an adapter. Microsoft also intends to allow cross-purchases and save synchronization between Xbox One and Windows 10 versions of games; Microsoft Studios games such as ReCore and Quantum Break are intended as being exclusive to Windows 10 and Xbox One.

Candy Crush Saga and Microsoft Solitaire Collection are also automatically installed upon installation of Windows 10.

Windows 10 adds native game recording and screenshot capture ability using the newly introduced Game Bar. Users can also have the OS continuously record gameplay in the background, which then allows the user to save the last few moments of gameplay to the storage device.

Windows 10 adds FLAC and HEVC codecs and support for the Matroska media container, allowing these formats to be opened in Windows Media Player and other applications. Windows Media Center is no longer bundled.

Windows 10 includes DirectX 12, alongside WDDM 2.0. Unveiled March 2014 at GDC, DirectX 12 aims to provide "console-level efficiency" with "closer to the metal" access to hardware resources, and reduced CPU and graphics driver overhead. Most of the performance improvements are achieved through low-level programming, which allow developers to use resources more efficiently and reduce single-threaded CPU bottlenecking caused by abstraction through higher level APIs. DirectX 12 will also feature support for vendor agnostic multi-GPU setups. WDDM 2.0 introduces a new virtual memory management and allocation system to reduce workload on the kernel-mode driver.

Font support 

Windows 10 adds three new default typefaces compared to Windows 8, but omits several others. The removed typefaces are available in supplemental packs and may be added manually over a non-metered internet connection.

Editions and pricing 

Windows 10 is available in five main editions for personal computing devices; the Home and Pro editions of which are sold at retail in most countries, and as pre-loaded software on new computers. Home is aimed at home users, while Pro is aimed at power users and small businesses. Each edition of Windows 10 includes all of the capabilities and features of the edition below it, and adds additional features oriented towards its market segments; for example, Pro adds additional networking and security features such as BitLocker, Device Guard, Windows Update for Business, and the ability to join a domain. Enterprise and Education, the other editions, contain additional features aimed towards business environments, and are only available through volume licensing.

As part of Microsoft's unification strategies, Windows products that are based on Windows 10's common platform but meant for specialized platforms are marketed as editions of the operating system, rather than as separate product lines. An updated version of Microsoft's Windows Phone operating system for smartphones, and also tablets, was branded as Windows 10 Mobile. Editions of Enterprise and Mobile will also be produced for embedded systems, along with Windows 10 IoT Core, which is designed specifically for use in small footprint, low-cost devices and Internet of Things (IoT) scenarios and is similar to Windows Embedded.

On May 2, 2017, Microsoft unveiled Windows 10 S (referred to in leaks as Windows 10 Cloud), a feature-limited edition of Windows 10 which was designed primarily for devices in the education market (competing, in particular, with ChromeOS netbooks), such as the Surface Laptop that Microsoft also unveiled at this time. The OS restricts software installation to applications obtained from Microsoft Store; the device may be upgraded to Windows 10 Pro for a fee to enable unrestricted software installation. As a time-limited promotion, Microsoft stated that this upgrade would be free on the Surface Laptop until March 31, 2018. Windows 10 S also contains a faster initial setup and login process, and allows devices to be provisioned using a USB drive with the Windows Intune for Education platform. In March 2018, Microsoft announced that Windows 10 S would be deprecated because of market confusion and would be replaced by "S Mode", an OEM option wherein Windows defaults to only allowing applications to be installed from Microsoft Store, but does not require payment in order to disable these restrictions.

Preview releases 

A public beta program for Windows10 known as the Windows Insider Program began with the first publicly available preview release on October 1, 2014. Insider preview builds are aimed towards enthusiasts and enterprise users for the testing and evaluation of updates and new features. Users of the Windows Insider program receive occasional updates to newer preview builds of the operating system and will continue to be able to evaluate preview releases after general availability (GA) in July 2015this is in contrast to previous Windows beta programs, where public preview builds were released less frequently and only during the months preceding GA. Windows Insider builds continued being released after the release to manufacturing (RTM) of Windows10.

Public release 
On July 29, 2015, Microsoft officially announced that Windows 10 would be released for retail purchase as a free upgrade from earlier versions of Windows. In comparison to previous Windows releases, which had a longer turnover between the release to manufacturing (RTM) and general release to allow for testing by vendors (and in some cases, the development of "upgrade kits" to prepare systems for installation of the new version), an HP executive explained that because it knew Microsoft targeted the operating system for a 2015 release, the company was able to optimize its then-current and upcoming products for Windows 10 in advance of its release, negating the need for such a milestone.

The general availability build of Windows10, numbered 10240, was first released to Windows Insider channels for pre-launch testing on July 15, 2015, prior to its formal release. Although a Microsoft official said there would be no specific RTM build of Windows 10, 10240 was described as an RTM build by media outlets because it was released to all Windows Insider members at once (rather than to users on the "Fast ring" first), it no longer carried pre-release branding and desktop watermark text, and its build number had mathematical connections to the number10 in reference to the operating system's naming. The Enterprise edition was released to volume licensing on August 1, 2015.

Windows 10 is distributed digitally through the "Media Creation Tool", which is functionally identical to the Windows 8 online installer, and can also be used to generate an ISO image or USB install media. In-place upgrades are supported from most editions of Windows 7 with Service Pack 1 and Windows8.1 with Update 1, while users with Windows8 must first upgrade to Windows8.1. Changing between architectures (e.g., upgrading from 32-bit edition to a 64-bit editions) via in-place upgrades is not supported; a clean install is required. In-place upgrades may be rolled back to the device's previous version of Windows, provided that 30days have not passed since installation, and backup files were not removed using Disk Cleanup.

Windows 10 was available in 190countries and 111 languages upon its launch, and as part of efforts to "re-engage" with users in China, Microsoft also announced that it would partner with Qihoo and Tencent to help promote and distribute Windows10 in China, and that Chinese PC maker Lenovo would provide assistance at its service centers and retail outlets for helping users upgrade to Windows10. At retail, Windows 10 is priced similarly to editions of Windows 8.1, with U.S. prices set at $119 and $199 for Windows 10Home and Pro respectively. A Windows 10 Pro Pack license allows upgrades from Windows 10 Home to Windows 10 Pro. Retail copies only ship on USB flash drive media; however, system builder copies still ship as DVD-ROM media. New devices shipping with Windows10 were also released during the operating system's launch window.

Windows RT devices cannot be upgraded to Windows10.

Free upgrade offer 

During its first year of availability, upgrade licenses for Windows10 could be obtained at no charge for devices with a genuine license for an eligible edition of Windows7 or8.1.

This offer did not apply to Enterprise editions, as customers under an active Software Assurance (SA)contract with upgrade rights are entitled to obtain Windows 10 Enterprise under their existing terms. All users running non-genuine copies of Windows, and those without an existing Windows7 or8 license, were ineligible for this promotion; although upgrades from a non-genuine version were possible, they result in a non-genuine copy of10.

On the general availability build of Windows10 (the original release), to activate and generate the "digital entitlement" for Windows10, the operating system must have first been installed as an in-place upgrade. During the free upgrade, a genuineticket.xml file is created in the background and the system's motherboard details are registered with a Microsoft Product Activation server. Once installed, the operating system can be reinstalled on that particular system via normal means without a product key, and the system's license will automatically be detected via online activation - in essence, the Microsoft Product Activation Server will remember the system's motherboard and give it the green light for product re-activation. Because of installation issues with Upgrade Only installs, the November Update (version 1511) included additional activation mechanisms. This build treated Windows7 and Windows8/8.1 product keys as Windows10 product keys, meaning they could be entered during installation to activate the free license, without the need to upgrade first to "activate" the hardware with Microsoft's activation servers. For major Original Equipment Manufacturers (OEMs), Windows 8/8.1 and Windows 10 OEM product keys are embedded in the firmware of the motherboard and if the correct edition of Windows 10 is present on the installation media, they are automatically inputted during installation. Since the release of the Fall Creators Update (version 1709), Microsoft decided to release multi-edition installation media, to alleviate installation and product activation issues users experienced because of accidentally installing the wrong edition of Windows 10.

The Windows Insider Preview version of Windows10 automatically updated itself to the generally released version as part of the version progression and continues to be updated to new beta builds, as it had throughout the testing process. Microsoft explicitly stated that Windows Insider was not a valid upgrade path for those running a version of Windows that is ineligible for the upgrade offer; although, if it was not installed with a license carried over from an in-place upgrade to 10 Insider Preview from Windows7 or8, the Insider Preview does remain activated as long as the user does not exit the Windows Insider program.

The offer was promoted and delivered via the "Get Windows10" application (also known as GWX), which was automatically installed via Windows Update ahead of Windows 10's release, and activated on systems deemed eligible for the upgrade offer. Via a notification area icon, users could access an application that advertised Windows10 and the free upgrade offer, check device compatibility, and "reserve" an automatic download of the operating system upon its release. On July 28, a pre-download process began in which Windows10 installation files were downloaded to some computers that had reserved it. Microsoft said that those who reserved Windows10 would be able to install it through GWX in a phased rollout process. The operating system could alternatively be downloaded at any time using a separate "Media Creation Tool" setup program, that allows for the creation of DVD or USB installation media.

In May 2016, Microsoft announced that the free upgrade offer would be extended to users of assistive technologies; however, Microsoft did not implement any means of certifying eligibility for this offer, which some outlets thereby promoted as being a loophole to fraudulently obtain a free Windows 10 upgrade. Microsoft said that the loophole is not intended to be used in this manner. In November 2017, Microsoft announced that this program would end on December 31, 2017.

However, another loophole was found that allowed Windows 7 and 8.1 users upgrade to Windows 10 using existing licenses, even though the free upgrade offers officially ended in 2017. No word from Microsoft was given whether it will be closed, and some outlets have continued to promote it as a free method of upgrading from the now-unsupported Windows 7.

Licensing 
During upgrades, Windows10 licenses are not tied directly to a product key. Instead, the license status of the system's current installation of Windows is migrated, and a "Digital license" (known as "Digital entitlement" in version 1511 or earlier) is generated during the activation process, which is bound to the hardware information collected during the process. If Windows10 is reinstalled cleanly and there have not been any significant hardware changes since installation (such as a motherboard change), the online activation process will automatically recognize the system's digital entitlement if no product key is entered during installations. However, unique product keys are still distributed within retail copies of Windows10. As with previous non-volume-licensed variants of Windows, significant hardware changes will invalidate the digital entitlement, and require Windows to be re-activated.

Updates and support 

Unlike previous versions of Windows, Windows Update does not allow the selective installation of updates, and all updates (including patches, feature updates, and driver software) are downloaded and installed automatically. Users can only choose whether their system will reboot automatically to install updates when the system is inactive, or be notified to schedule a reboot. If a wireless network is designated as "Metered"—a function which automatically reduces the operating system's background network activity to conserve limits on Internet usage—most updates are not downloaded until the device is connected to a non-metered network. Version 1703 allows wired (Ethernet) networks to be designated as metered, but Windows may still download certain updates while connected to a metered network.

In version 2004, by installing the August 2020 security update and later versions, driver and non-security updates pushed via Windows Update that are considered optional are no longer automatically downloaded and installed in their devices. Users can access them on Settings > Update & Security > Windows Update > View optional update.

Updates can cause compatibility or other problems; a Microsoft troubleshooter program allows bad updates to be uninstalled.

Under the Windows end-user license agreement, users consent to the automatic installation of all updates, features and drivers provided by the service, and implicitly consent "without any additional notice" to the possibility of features being modified or removed. The agreement also states, specifically for users of Windows10 in Canada, that they may pause updates by disconnecting their device from the Internet.

Windows Update can also use a peer-to-peer system for distributing updates; by default, users' bandwidth is used to distribute previously downloaded updates to other users, in combination with Microsoft servers. Users can instead choose to only use peer-to-peer updates within their local area network.

Support lifecycle 

The original release of Windows 10 receives mainstream support for five years after its original release, followed by five years of extended support, but this is subject to conditions. Microsoft's support lifecycle policy for the operating system notes that updates "are cumulative, with each update built upon all of the updates that preceded it", that "a device needs to install the latest update to remain supported", and that a device's ability to receive future updates will depend on hardware compatibility, driver availability, and whether the device is within the OEM's "support period"a new aspect not accounted for in lifecycle policies for previous versions. This policy was first invoked in 2017 to block Intel Clover Trail devices from receiving the Creators Update, as Microsoft asserts that future updates "require additional hardware support to provide the best possible experience", and that Intel no longer provided support or drivers for the platform. Microsoft stated that these devices would no longer receive feature updates, but would still receive security updates through January 2023. Microsoft will continue to support at least one standard Windows 10 release until October 14, 2025.

The following table collects current status of the aforementioned updating and support of different branches of Windows 10:

Feature updates 
Windows 10 is often described by Microsoft as being a "service", as it receives regular "feature updates" that contain new features and other updates and fixes. In April 2017, Microsoft stated that these updates would be released twice a year every March and September in the future, which eventually continued until version 21H2. Mainstream builds of Windows 10, up to 2004, were labeled "YYMM", with "YY" representing the two-digit year and "MM" representing the month of release. For example, version 1809 was released in September (the ninth month) of 2018. This was changed with the 20H2 release where "MM" represents the half of the year in which the update was released, for example H1 for the first half and H2 for the second half.

Before version 1903, the pace at which feature updates are received by devices was dependent on which release channel was used. The default branch for all users of Windows10 Home and Pro was "Semi-Annual Channel (Targeted)" (formerly "Current Branch", or "CB"), which received stable builds after they were publicly released by Microsoft. Each build of Windows 10 is supported for 18 months after its original release. In enterprise environments, Microsoft officially intended that this branch was used for "targeted" deployments of newly released stable versions so that they could be evaluated and tested on a limited number of devices before a wider deployment. Once a stable build is certified by Microsoft and its partners as being suitable for broad deployment, the build is then released on the "Semi-Annual Channel" (formerly "Current Branch for Business", or "CBB"), which is supported by the Pro and Enterprise editions of Windows 10. Semi-Annual Channel receives stable builds on a four-month delay from their release on the Targeted channel. Administrators can also use the "Windows Update for Business" system, as well as existing tools such as WSUS and System Center Configuration Manager, to organize structured deployments of feature updates across their networks.

The Windows Insider branches receive unstable builds as they are released; it is divided into two channels, "Dev" (which receives new builds immediately after their release), and "Beta" (whose releases are slightly delayed from their "Dev" release).

Enterprise licensees may use the Windows 10 Enterprise LTSC (formerly LTSB) edition, where "LTSC" stands for "Long-Term Servicing Channel", which only receive quality of life updates (i.e. security patches), and has a full 5 or 10-year support lifecycle for each build. This edition is designed for "special-purpose devices" that perform a fixed function (such as automated teller machines and medical equipment). For this reason, it excludes Cortana, Microsoft Store, and all bundled Universal Windows Platform apps (including but not limited to Microsoft Edge, hence these builds ship only with Internet Explorer as browser). Microsoft director Stella Chernyak explained that "we have businesses [that] may have mission-critical environments where we respect the fact they want to test and stabilize the environment for a long time." Four LTSC builds have been released, correlating with the 1507, 1607, 1809, and 21H2 versions of Windows 10, respectively.

In July 2017, Microsoft announced changes in the terminology for Windows branches as part of its effort to unify the update cadence with that of Office 365 ProPlus and Windows Server 2016. The branch system now defines two paces of upgrade deployment in enterprise environments, "targeted" initial deployment of a new version on selected systems immediately after its stable release for final testing, and "broad" deployment afterwards. Hence, "Current Branch" is now known as "Semi-Annual Channel (Targeted)", and "Current Branch for Business" for broad deployment is now referred to as "Semi-Annual Channel".

In February 2019, Microsoft announced changes again in delivering updates beginning with release of version 1903: a single SAC will be released, SAC-T will be retired, and users are no longer able to switch to different channels. Instead, these updates can be deferred from 30 to 90 days, or depending on how the device was configured to defer the updates. In April 2019, it was announced that, in addition, feature updates will no longer be automatically pushed to users. However, after the release of version 2004, the update only pushed for those running a feature update version that is nearing end of service or it can be paused for up to 35 days. In November 2021, following the launch of version 21H2, Microsoft made a commitment to deliver feature updates every October or November. Thus, Microsoft rebranded the "Semi-Annual Channel" to the "General Availability Channel".

Feature updates prior to version 1909 were distributed solely as an in-place upgrade installation, requiring the download of a complete operating system package (approximately 3.5 GB in size for 64-bit systems). Unlike previous builds, version 1909 was designed primarily as an update rollup version of 1903, which focused primarily on minor feature additions and enhancements. For upgrades to 1909 from 1903, a new delivery method was used where its changes were delivered as part of the monthly cumulative update, but were left in a dormant state until the 1909 update "enablement" patch is installed. The full upgrade process was still used for those using builds prior to 1903.

Features in development 
In May 2017, Microsoft unveiled Fluent Design System (previously codenamed "Project Neon"), a revamp of Microsoft Design Language 2 that will include guidelines for the designs and interactions used within software designed for all Windows 10 devices and platforms. The new design language will include the more prominent use of motion, depth, and translucency effects. Microsoft stated that the implementation of this design language would be performed over time, and it had already started to implement elements of it in the Creators Update and Fall Creators Update.

On December 7, 2016, Microsoft announced that, as part of a partnership with Qualcomm, it planned to introduce support for running Win32 software on ARM architecture with a 32-bit x86 processor emulator, in 2017. Terry Myerson stated that this move would enable the production of Qualcomm Snapdragon-based Windows devices with cellular connectivity and improved power efficiency over Intel-compatible devices, and still capable of running the majority of existing Windows software (unlike the previous Windows RT, which was restricted to Windows Store apps). Microsoft is initially targeting this project towards laptops. Microsoft launched the branding Always Connected PCs in December 2017 to market Windows 10 devices with cellular connectivity, which included two ARM-based 2-in-1 laptops from Asus and HP featuring the Snapdragon 835 system-on-chip, and the announcement of a partnership between AMD and Qualcomm to integrate its Snapdragon X16 gigabit LTE modem with AMD's Ryzen Mobile platform.

In August 2019, Microsoft began testing changes to its handling of the user interface on convertible devices—downplaying the existing "Tablet Mode" option in favor of presenting the normal desktop with optimizations for touch when a keyboard is not present, such as increasing the space between taskbar buttons and displaying the virtual keyboard when text fields are selected.

In April 2021, the ability to run Linux applications using a graphical user interface, such as Audacity, directly in Windows, was introduced as a preview. This feature would later be included as part of the updated Windows Subsystem for Linux 2 for Windows 11 only.

System requirements 

The basic hardware requirements to install Windows 10 were initially the same as those for Windows 8 and Windows 8.1, and only slightly higher than for Windows 7 and Windows Vista. As of the May 2019 update, the minimum disk space requirement has been increased to 32 GB. In addition, on new installations, Windows permanently reserves up to 7 GB of disk space in order to ensure proper installation of future feature updates.

The 64-bit variants require a CPU that supports certain instructions. Devices with low storage capacity must provide a USB flash drive or SD card with sufficient storage for temporary files during upgrades.

Some pre-built devices may be described as "certified" by Microsoft.

As with Windows 8, all certified devices must ship with UEFI Secure Boot enabled by default. Unlike Windows 8, OEMs are no longer required to make Secure Boot settings user-configurable, meaning that devices may optionally be locked to run only Microsoft-signed operating systems. A supported infrared-illuminated camera is required for Windows Hello face authentication, and a supported fingerprint reader is required for Windows Hello fingerprint authentication. Device Guard requires a UEFI system with no third-party certificates loaded, and CPU virtualization extensions (including SLAT and IOMMU) enabled in firmware.

Beginning with Intel Kaby Lake and AMD Bristol Ridge, Windows 10 is the only version of Windows that Microsoft will officially support on newer CPU microarchitectures. Terry Myerson stated that Microsoft did not want to make further investments in optimizing older versions of Windows and associated software for newer generations of processors. These policies were criticized by the media, who especially noted that Microsoft was refusing to support newer hardware (particularly Intel's Skylake CPUs, which was also originally targeted by the new policy with a premature end of support that was ultimately retracted) on Windows 8.1, a version of Windows that was still in mainstream support until January 2018. In addition, an enthusiast-created modification was released that disabled the check and allowed Windows 8.1 and earlier versions to continue to work on the platform.

Windows 10 versions 1703 and later do not support Intel Clover Trail system-on-chips, per Microsoft's stated policy of only providing updates for devices during their OEM support period.

Starting with Windows 10 version 2004, Microsoft will require new OEM devices to use 64-bit processors, and will therefore cease the distribution of x86 (32-bit) variants of Windows 10 via OEM channels. The 32-bit variants of Windows 10 will remain available via non-OEM channels, and Microsoft will continue to "[provide] feature and security updates on these devices". This was later followed by Windows 11 dropping 32-bit hardware support altogether, and thus making Windows 10 the final version of Windows to have a 32-bit version.

Physical memory limits 
The maximum amount of RAM that Windows 10 can support varies depending on the product edition and the processor architecture. All 32-bit editions of Windows 10, including Home and Pro, support up to 4 GB. 64-bit editions of Windows 10 Education and Pro support up to 2 TB, 64-bit editions of Windows 10 Pro for Workstations and Enterprise support up to 6 TB, while the 64-bit edition of Windows 10 Home is limited to 128 GB.

Processor limits 
Windows 10 supports up to two physical processors. A maximum of 32 cores is supported in 32-bit versions of Windows 8, whereas up to 256 cores are supported in the 64-bit versions.

Reception 

Windows 10 received generally positive reviews, with most reviewers considering it superior to its predecessor Windows 8. CNN Business praised every aspect of Windows 10. TechRadar felt that it could be "the new Windows 7", citing the operating system's more familiar user interface, improvements to bundled apps, performance improvements, a "rock solid" search system, and the Settings app being more full-featured than its equivalents on8 and8.1. The Edge browser was praised for its performance, although it was not in a feature-complete state at launch. While considering them a "great idea in principle", concerns were shown for Microsoft's focus on the universal app ecosystem:

It's by no means certain that developers are going to flock to Windows10 from iOS and Android simply because they can convert their apps easily. It may well become a no-brainer for them, but at the moment a conscious decision is still required.

Engadget was similarly positive, noting that the upgrade process was painless and that Windows10's user interface had balanced aspects of Windows8 with those of previous versions with a more mature aesthetic. Cortana's always-on voice detection was considered to be its "true strength", also citing its query capabilities and personalization features, but noting that it was not as pre-emptive as Google Now. Windows10's stock applications were praised for being improved over their Windows 8 counterparts, and for supporting windowed modes. The Xbox app was also praised for its Xbox One streaming functionality, although recommending its use over a wired network because of inconsistent quality over Wi-Fi. In conclusion, it was argued that "Windows10 delivers the most refined desktop experience ever from Microsoft, and yet it's so much more than that. It's also a decent tablet OS, and it's ready for a world filled with hybrid devices. And, barring another baffling screwup, it looks like a significant step forward for mobile. Heck, it makes the Xbox One a more useful machine."

On the other hand Ars Technica panned the new Tablet mode interface for removing the charms and app switching, making the Start button harder to use by requiring users to reach for the button on the bottom-left rather than at the center of the screen when swiping with a thumb, and for making application switching less instantaneous through the use of Task View. Microsoft Edge was praised for being "tremendously promising", and "a much better browser than Internet Explorer ever was", but criticized it for its lack of functionality on-launch. In conclusion, contrasting Windows8 as being a "reliable" platform albeit consisting of unfinished concepts, Windows10 was considered "the best Windows yet", and was praised for having a better overall concept in its ability to be "comfortable and effective" across a wide array of form factors, but that it was buggier than previous versions of Windows were on-launch. ExtremeTech felt that Windows10 restricted the choices of users, citing its more opaque setting menus, forcing users to give up bandwidth for the peer-to-peer distribution of updates, and for taking away user control of specific functions, such as updates, explaining that "it feels, once again, as if Microsoft has taken the seed of a good idea, like providing users with security updates automatically, and shoved the throttle to maximum." Windows 10 has also received criticism because of deleting files without user permission after auto updates.

Critics have noted that Windows10 heavily emphasizes freemium services, and contains various advertising facilities. Some outlets have considered these to be a hidden "cost" of the free upgrade offer. Examples of these have included microtransactions in bundled games such as Microsoft Solitaire Collection, default settings that display promotions of "suggested" apps in the Start menu, "tips" on the lock screen that may contain advertising, ads displayed in File Explorer for Office 365 subscriptions on Creators' Update, and various advertising notifications displayed by default which promote Microsoft Edge when it is not set as the default web browser (including, in a September 2018 build, nag pop-ups displayed to interrupt the installation process of competitors).

Due to the high system requirements of its Windows 10's successor Windows 11, some critics have cited Windows 10 being better than its successor and have warned not to switch to Windows 11 given its high system requirement despite very limited new features compared to Windows 10.

Market share and sales 

Up to August 2016, Windows 10 usage was increasing, with it then plateauing, while eventually in 2018, it became more popular than Windows 7 (though Windows 7 was still more used in some countries in Asia and Africa in 2019). , the operating system is running on over a billion devices, reaching the goal set by Microsoft two years after the initial deadline.

Twenty-four hours after it was released, Microsoft announced that over 14million devices were running Windows10. On August 26, Microsoft said over 75million devices were running Windows10, in 192countries, and on over 90,000 unique PC or tablet models. According to Terry Myerson, there were over 110million devices running Windows10 as of October 6, 2015. On January 4, 2016, Microsoft reported that Windows10 had been activated on over 200million devices since the operating system's launch in July 2015.

According to StatCounter, Windows 10 overtook Windows 8.1 in December 2015. Iceland was the first country where Windows 10 was ranked first (not only on the desktop, but across all platforms), with several larger European countries following. For one week in late November 2016, Windows 10 overtook first rank from Windows 7 in the United States, before losing it again. By February 2017, Windows 10 was losing market share to Windows 7.

In mid-January 2018, Windows 10 had a slightly higher global market share than Windows 7, with it noticeably more popular on weekends, while popularity varies widely by region, e.g. Windows 10 was then still behind in Africa and far ahead in some other regions e.g. Oceania.

Update system changes 
Windows 10 Home is permanently set to download all updates automatically, including cumulative updates, security patches, and drivers, and users cannot individually select updates to install or not. Microsoft offers a diagnostic tool that can be used to hide updates and prevent them from being reinstalled, but only after they had been already installed, then uninstalled without rebooting the system. Tom Warren of The Verge felt that, given web browsers such as Google Chrome had already adopted such an automatic update system, such a requirement would help to keep all Windows10 devices secure, and felt that "if you're used to family members calling you for technical support because they've failed to upgrade to the latest Windows service pack or some malware disabled Windows Update then those days will hopefully be over."

Concerns were raised that because of these changes, users would be unable to skip the automatic installation of updates that are faulty or cause issues with certain system configurations—although build upgrades will also be subject to public beta testing via Windows Insider program. There were also concerns that the forced installation of driver updates through Windows Update, where they were previously designated as "optional", could cause conflicts with drivers that were installed independently of Windows Update. An example of such a situation occurred prior to the general release of the operating system, when an Nvidia graphics card driver that was automatically pushed to Windows10 users via Windows Update caused issues that prevented the use of certain functions, or prevented their system from booting at all.

Criticism was also directed towards Microsoft's decision to no longer provide specific details on the contents of cumulative updates for Windows 10. On February 9, 2016, Microsoft retracted this decision and began to provide release notes for cumulative updates on the Windows website.

Some users reported that during the installation of the November upgrade, some applications (particularly utility programs such as CPU-Z and Speccy) were automatically uninstalled during the upgrade process, and some default programs were reset to Microsoft-specified defaults (such as Photos app, and Microsoft Edge for PDF viewing), both without warning.

Further issues were discovered upon the launch of the Anniversary Update ("Redstone"), including a bug that caused some devices to freeze (but addressed by cumulative update KB3176938, released on August 31, 2016), and that fundamental changes to how Windows handles webcams had caused many to stop working.

In June 2017, a Redstone 3 Insider build (RS_EDGE_CASE in PC and rs_IoT on Mobile) was accidentally released to both Insider and non-Insider users on all Windows 10 devices, but the update was retracted, with Microsoft apologizing and releasing a note on their Windows Insider Program blog describing how to prevent the build from being installed on their device. According to Dona Sarkar, this was due to "an inadvertent deployment to the engineering system that controls which builds/which rings to push out to insiders."

A Gartner analyst felt that Windows 10 Pro was becoming increasingly inappropriate for use in enterprise environments because of support policy changes by Microsoft, including consumer-oriented upgrade lifecycle length, and only offering extended support for individual builds to Enterprise and Education editions of Windows 10.

Critics have acknowledged that Microsoft's update and testing practices had been affecting the overall quality of Windows 10. In particular, it was pointed out that Microsoft's internal testing departments had been prominently affected by a major round of layoffs undertaken by the company in 2014. Microsoft relies primarily on user testing and bug reports via the Windows Insider program (which may not always be of sufficient quality to identify a bug), as well as correspondence with OEMs and other stakeholders. In the wake of the known folder redirection data loss bug in the version 1809, it was pointed out that bug reports describing the issue had been present on the Feedback Hub app for several months prior to the public release. Following the incident, Microsoft updated Feedback Hub so that users may specify the severity of a particular bug report. When announcing the resumption of 1809's rollout, Microsoft stated that it planned to be more transparent in its handling of update quality in the future, through a series of blog posts that will detail its testing process and the planned development of a "dashboard" that will indicate the rollout progress of future updates.

Distribution practices 
Microsoft was criticized for the tactics that it used to promote its free upgrade campaign for Windows 10, including adware-like behaviors, using deceptive user interfaces to coax users into installing the operating system, downloading installation files without user consent, and making it difficult for users to suppress the advertising and notifications if they did not wish to upgrade to 10. The upgrade offer was marketed and initiated using the "Get Windows 10" (GWX) application, which was first downloaded and installed via Windows Update in March 2015. Registry keys and group policies could be used to partially disable the GWX mechanism, but the installation of patches to the GWX software via Windows Update could reset these keys back to defaults, and thus reactivate the software. Third-party programs were also created to assist users in applying measures to disable GWX.

In September 2015, it was reported that Microsoft was triggering automatic downloads of Windows 10 installation files on all compatible Windows 7 or 8.1 systems configured to automatically download and install updates, regardless of whether or not they had specifically requested the upgrade. Microsoft officially confirmed the change, claiming it was "an industry practice that reduces the time for installation and ensures device readiness." This move was criticized by users with data caps or devices with low storage capacity, as resources were consumed by the automatic downloads of up to 6 GB of data. Other critics argued that Microsoft should not have triggered any downloading of Windows 10 installation files without user consent.

In October 2015, Windows 10 began to appear as an "Optional" update on the Windows Update interface, but pre-selected for installation on some systems. A Microsoft spokesperson said that this was a mistake, and that the download would no longer be pre-selected by default. However, on October 29, 2015, Microsoft announced that it planned to classify Windows 10 as a "recommended" update in the Windows Update interface sometime in 2016, which would cause an automatic download of installation files and a one-time prompt with a choice to install to appear. In December 2015, it was reported that a new advertising dialog had begun to appear, only containing "Upgrade now" and "Upgrade tonight" buttons, and no obvious method to decline installation besides the close button.

In March 2016, some users also alleged that their Windows 7 and 8.1 devices had automatically begun upgrading to Windows 10 without their consent. In June 2016, the GWX dialog's behavior changed to make closing the window imply a consent to a scheduled upgrade. Despite this, an InfoWorld editor disputed the claims that upgrades had begun without any consent at all; testing showed that the upgrade to Windows 10 would only begin once the user accepts the end-user license agreement (EULA) presented by its installer, and that not doing so would eventually cause Windows Update to time out with an error, thus halting the installation attempt. It was concluded that these users may have unknowingly clicked the "Accept" prompt without full knowledge that this would begin the upgrade. In December 2016, Microsoft's chief marketing officer Chris Capossela admitted that the company had "gone too far" by using this tactic, stating, "we know we want people to be running Windows 10 from a security perspective, but finding the right balance where you're not stepping over the line of being too aggressive is something we tried and for a lot of the year I think we got it right."

On January 21, 2016, Microsoft was sued in small claims court by a user whose computer had attempted to upgrade to Windows 10 without her consent shortly after the release of the operating system. The upgrade failed, and her computer was left in a broken state thereafter, which disrupted the ability to run her travel agency. The court ruled in favor of the user and awarded her $10,000 in damages, but Microsoft appealed. However, in May 2016, Microsoft dropped the appeal and chose to pay the damages. Shortly after the suit was reported on by the Seattle Times, Microsoft confirmed it was updating the GWX software once again to add more explicit options for opting out of a free Windows 10 upgrade; the final notification was a full-screen pop-up window notifying users of the impending end of the free upgrade offer, and contained "Remind me later", "Do not notify me again" and "Notify me three more times" as options.

In March 2019, Microsoft announced that it would display notifications informing users on Windows 7 devices of the upcoming end of extended support for the platform, and direct users to a website urging them to upgrade to Windows 10 or purchase new hardware. This dialog will be similar to the previous Windows 10 upgrade prompts, but will not explicitly mention Windows 10.

Privacy and data collection 
Privacy advocates and other critics have expressed concern regarding Windows10's privacy policies and its collection and use of customer data. Under the default "Express" settings, Windows10 is configured to send various information to Microsoft and other parties, including the collection of user contacts, calendar data, and "associated input data" to personalize "speech, typing, and inking input", typing and inking data to improve recognition, allowing apps to use a unique "advertisingID" for analytics and advertising personalization (functionality introduced by Windows 8.1) and allow apps to request the user's location data and send this data to Microsoft and "trusted partners" to improve location detection (Windows8 had similar settings, except that location data collection did not include "trusted partners"). Users can opt out from most of this data collection, but telemetry data for error reporting and usage is also sent to Microsoft, and this cannot be disabled on non-Enterprise editions of Windows10. Microsoft's privacy policy states, however, that "Basic"-level telemetry data is anonymized and cannot be used to identify an individual user or device. The use of Cortana also requires the collection of data "such as Your PC location, data from your calendar, the apps you use, data from your emails and text messages, who you call, your contacts and how often you interact with them on Your PC" to personalize its functionality.

Rock Paper Shotgun writer Alec Meer argued that Microsoft's intent for this data collection lacked transparency, stating that "there is no world in which 45pages of policy documents and opt-out settings split across 13different settings screens and an external website constitutes 'real transparency'." Joel Hruska of ExtremeTech wrote that "the company that brought us the 'Scroogled' campaign now hoovers up your data in ways that would make Google jealous." However, it was also pointed out that the requirement for such vast usage of customer data had become a norm, citing the increased reliance on cloud computing and other forms of external processing, as well as similar data collection requirements for services on mobile devices such as Google Now and Siri. In August 2015, Russian politician Nikolai Levichev called for Windows10 to be banned from use within the Russian government, as it sends user data to servers in the United States. The Russian government had passed a federal law requiring all online services to store the data of Russian users on servers within the country by September 2016 or be blocked. Writing for ZDNet, Ed Bott said that the lack of complaints by businesses about privacy in Windows10 indicated "how utterly normal those privacy terms are in 2015." In a Computerworld editorial, Preston Gralla said that "the kind of information Windows10 gathers is no different from what other operating systems gather. But Microsoft is held to a different standard than other companies".

The Microsoft Services agreement reads that the company's online services may automatically "download software updates or configuration changes, including those that prevent you from accessing the Services, playing counterfeit games, or using unauthorized hardware peripheral devices." Critics interpreted this statement as implying that Microsoft would scan for and delete unlicensed software installed on devices running Windows10. However, others pointed out that this agreement was specifically for Microsoft online services such as Microsoft account, Office 365, Skype, as well as Xbox Live, and that the offending passage most likely referred to digital rights management on Xbox consoles and first-party games, and not plans to police pirated video games installed on Windows10 PCs. Despite this, some torrent trackers announced plans to block Windows10 users, also arguing that the operating system could send information to anti-piracy groups that are affiliated with Microsoft. Writing about these allegations, Ed Bott of ZDNet compared Microsoft's privacy policy to Apple's and Google's and concluded that he "[didn't] see anything that looks remotely like Big Brother." Columnist Kim Komando argued that "Microsoft might in the future run scans and disable software or hardware it sees as a security threat", consistent with the Windows10 update policy.

In September 2019, Microsoft hid the option to create a local account during a fresh installation if a PC is connected to the internet. This move was criticized by users who did not want to use an online Microsoft account. Additionally, in Windows 10 Home, the first Microsoft account linked to the primary user's account can no longer be unlinked, but other users can unlink their own Microsoft accounts from their user accounts.

In late-July 2020, Windows Defender began to classify modifications of the hosts file that block Microsoft telemetry servers as being a severe security risk.

See also 

Comparison of operating systems
History of operating systems
List of operating systems
Microsoft Windows version history

References

External links 

Download Windows 10 from Microsoft website
Windows 10 release information from Microsoft

Windows 10
2015 software
ARM operating systems
IA-32 operating systems
Proprietary operating systems
Tablet operating systems
10
X86-64 operating systems